Anton Hykisch (born 23 February 1932, Banská Štiavnica, Slovakia) is a Slovak writer, politician and diplomat. Hykisch was a member of the Slovak National Assembly (Slovak Parliament) from 1990 to 1992 and the first Slovak ambassador to Canada from 1993 to 1997.

Work

Creation for adults 
 1961 – Dream Enters the Station, short story
 1963 – A Step into the Unknown, debut novel (written and published in 1959, scrapped immediately after publication)
 1963 - I Met You, short story
 1964 – Naďa, novella
 1965 – Námestie v Mähring, novel
 1971 – And you won't find peace anywhere, or Murder in the Spa, detective story (published only in Czech)
 1977 - The Time of the Masters, a two-part historical novel
 1978 – Relationships, short story
 1979 - The Good Secret Brain, a collection of science fiction short stories and news
 1980 – Desire, short story
 1984 - Love the Queen, historical novel
 1988 – Atomic Summer, novel – fictionalization of current events
 1990 – Defense of Secrets, a collection of fantasy prose
 1999 – Maria Theresa
 2006 – The Thirteenth Hour. Time of the Masters (reissue)
 2006 – Alone in Strange Cities
 2007 – Remember the Tsar
 2009 – The Delights of Old Times. A novel about the 20th century with autobiographical elements
 2016 – Believe the Emperor, a historical novel from the reign of Joseph II.

Creation for children 
1987 – The Future is Today, a non-fiction book
1989 – Friend Čipko, author's fairy tale connected with popular science literature

Essays 
2001 – Let's not be afraid of the world
2003 – What I Think About It

Nonfiction 
1968 – Canada is not "Canada", a travel book of reports
1975 – Steering wheels to the skies, a factual book about car racing and famous racers
1990 – Vacation in Beijing, travelogue
2004 – What politics tastes like. Memories and Records from 1990-1992

Other works 
1965 – He doesn't play the blues for me, screenplay for the film, based on the novel A Step into the Unknown
1966 – Praskanie, radio play
1969 – Conception, radio play
1988 – Such Strange Conversations, radio work

External links

References 

1932 births
People from Banská Štiavnica
Slovak speculative fiction writers
Slovak diplomats
Members of the National Council (Slovakia) 1992-1994
Ambassadors of Slovakia to Canada
Living people